Terence Roy McGriff (born September 23, 1963) is an American former professional baseball player who played for the Cincinnati Reds, Houston Astros, Florida Marlins, and St. Louis Cardinals of Major League Baseball (MLB).

Career
He was drafted by the Cincinnati Reds in the 8th round of the 1981 Major League Baseball draft, and he made his MLB debut on July 11, 1987. After retiring from playing, he became the bench/hitting coach for the Bridgeport Bluefish.

On August 7, 1988, McGriff caught a no-hitter with batterymate Jack Armstrong of the Triple-A Nashville Sounds. The game was one walk shy of being a perfect game.

McGriff is the cousin of Fred McGriff and the uncle of Charles Johnson, both of whom are former major league All-Stars.

References

An Interview with Terry McGriff. AstrosDaily.com. Retrieved on May 15, 2016.

External links
, or Retrosheet
Pura Pelota (Venezuelan Winter League)

1963 births
Living people
African-American baseball players
American expatriate baseball players in Canada
American expatriate baseball players in Mexico
Baseball coaches from Florida
Baseball players from Florida
Billings Mustangs players
Bridgeport Bluefish players
Cincinnati Reds players
Denver Zephyrs players
Edmonton Trappers players
Eugene Emeralds players
Florida Marlins players
Guerreros de Oaxaca players
Houston Astros players
Major League Baseball catchers
Minor league baseball coaches
Nashville Sounds players
People from Fort Pierce, Florida
St. Louis Cardinals players
Syracuse Chiefs players
Tampa Tarpons (1957–1987) players
Tecolotes de Nuevo Laredo players
Tigres de Aragua players
American expatriate baseball players in Venezuela
Toledo Mud Hens players
Tucson Toros players
Vermont Reds players
21st-century African-American people
20th-century African-American sportspeople